Vice Squad are an English punk rock band formed in 1979 in Bristol. The band was formed from two other local punk bands, The Contingent and TV Brakes. The songwriter and vocalist Beki Bondage (born Rebecca Bond) was a founding member of the band. Although there was a period of time when the band had a different vocalist she reformed the band in 1997. Since 2008, the band have been releasing records on their own label Last Rockers.

History

Original band
Vice Squad was formed in 1979 in Bristol. The initial line-up of Beki Bondage (vocals), Dave Bateman (guitar), Mark Hambly (bass guitar) and Shane Baldwin (drums), and played its first gig at Bristol University's Anson Rooms on 12 April 1979. Bateman and Baldwin had previously been members of the TV Brakes. The first release by TV Brakes was the track "Nothing", which was included on the 1979 compilation Avon Calling. Members of the band were involved in setting up the Riot City label with Simon Edwards, the label becoming one of the major punk labels of the era. Vice Squad took some time to make further impact, only playing six gigs in 1980. Its first single, "Last Rockers" in 1981, was well-received, selling over 20,000 copies and spending almost forty weeks in the UK Indie Chart, reaching number 7. The follow-up, "Resurrection", reached number 4, and the band undertook a tour supporting UK Subs. The singles received airplay and support from BBC Radio 1 DJ John Peel, and the band went on to record two sessions for his show, in 1981 and 1982.

In 1981, the band signed with the major label EMI (on their Zonophone subsidiary), prompting criticism from many within the DIY punk scene. Their first album, No Cause For Concern, was released in late 1981, reaching number 32 in the UK Album Chart. A second album, Stand Strong Stand Proud, followed in 1982, and the band embarked on a tour of the United States and Canada. On returning from the US, Bondage announced that she was leaving the band. She went on to front Ligotage and later Beki and the Bombshells, and, without her, Vice Squad were dropped by EMI. The band carried on, however, replacing Bondage with a new singer called Lia (who was previously known as Jools and had been the singer for local band Affairs of the Heart). The new line-up, also including the band's manager Mark "Sooty" Byrne on second guitar, signed with Anagram Records, and recorded a session for David Jensen's BBC radio show. Indie hits continued with singles such as "Black Sheep" and "You'll Never Know", but sales dwindled, and the band split up in 1985.

New band

Bondage formed a new version of Vice Squad in 1997, along with former members of The Bombshells, after being persuaded to perform the old material at the Holidays in the Sun festival. The line-up was initially Bondage on vocals, Paul Rooney (guitar), Stilton (bass guitar) and Pumpy (drums). The rhythm section was replaced by Michael Giaquinto (bass guitar) and Tony Piper (drums) in late 1999/early 2000. This new line-up recorded several albums and toured Europe and the United States. In 2006, they released the album Defiant, produced by Rooney.

Dave Bateman died in 2007.

Back to "old school punk"
2008 was spent recording the album, Fairground for the Demented which was shelved as the band decided the finished collection of songs did not represent the 'Old School' punk sound that the band wanted to achieve. This collection of songs is currently released in digital form with retailers such as iTunes and Napster. The gritty punk style was eventually realised in 2009 when Vice Squad released the London Underground album which was co-produced by Bond and Rooney. Released on their own Last Rockers Label, London Underground has received rave reviews on the Studs And Punks website and songs such as "Punx United", "Old Skool" and "Sniffing Glue" form a major part of the band's live show.

Vice Squad returned to America in 2009 on an 18 date tour of the western states promoting London Underground with the American drummer Nick Manning, and Wayne Cotton on Bass (Ex Stuntface bass / front man) with support from The Lower Class Brats.

The album Punk Rock Radio was released in 2011.

In 2014, the album Cardboard Country was completed and released on the band's own Last Rockers Records label. The album was funded on with via the band's first ever PledgeMusic campaign. The first 500 copies of the album came with a 6 track EP.

During 2018, the band started recording the album, Battle of Britain. Six singles/EPs were released prior to the album's release, including two versions of Ignored To Death.

On 11 April 2020, due to the lockdown in the UK, The Beki and Lumpy Show was launched on Facebook, featuring Beki and Paul, with videos, chat and quizzes, broadcasting every Saturday evening. The album Battle of Britain was released in October by Last Rockers and Cargo Records.

Discography

Studio albums
 No Cause for Concern (1981) Zonophone (UK No. 32)
 Stand Strong Stand Proud (1982) Zonophone (UK No. 47)
 Shot Away (1985) Anagram
 Get a Life (1999) Rhythm Vicar
 Resurrection (1999) Rhythm Vicar
 Lo-Fi Life (2000) Sudden Death
 Rich and Famous (2003) EMI
 Defiant (2006) SOS
 Unreleased 2008 (2009) Last Rockers
 London Underground (2009) Last Rockers
 Punk Rock Radio (2011) Last Rockers
 Cardboard Country (2014) Last Rockers
 Battle of Britain (2020) Last Rockers

Live albums
 Live in Sheffield (1981) Chaos Tapes Cat: Live003 – cassette only release – limited edition of 3000
Track Listing:
A Side: Resurrection / We're Still Dying / Coward / Young Blood.
B Side: The Times They Are A Changing / 1981 / Change The Record / Saturday Night Special / Sell Out.
 Live and Loud!! (1988) Link

Compilation albums
 Last Rockers – The Singles (1992) Abstract
 The Punk Singles Collection (1995) Anagram
 The BBC Sessions (1997) Anagram
 The Rarities (1999) Captain Oi!
 The Very Best Of (2000) Anagram
 Bang to Rights: The Essential Vice Squad Collection (2001) EMI
 The Riot City Years (2004) Step-1
 Fuck Authority (2007) Anarchy
 Punks for a Princess Vol.2 (2012)

Singles and EPs
 "Last Rockers" (1980) Riot City (UK Indie No. 7)
 "Resurrection" (1981) Riot City (UK Indie No. 4)
 Special Edition Tour EP (1982) Riot City (UK Indie No. 21)
 "Out of Reach" (1982) EMI/Zonophone (UK No. 68)
 "Stand Strong" (1982) EMI/Zonophone
 "State of the Nation" (1982) Riot City
 "Black Sheep" (1983) Anagram (UK Indie No. 13)
 "You'll Never Know" (1984) Anagram
 "Teenage Rampage" (1985) Anagram (UK Indie No. 44)
 "Lavender Hill Mob" (2000) Combat Rock
 Bah Humbug EP (2010) Last Rockers – limited edition of 50, four track CD single, (includes "Santa Claws Is Coming to Town")
 Rockin Xmas EP (2009) Last Rockers – limited edition of 100, seven track CD single, (includes "Rockin' Around the Christmas Tree")
 London Lowlife EP (2011) Last Rockers – limited edition of 100, four track CD single (tracks: "Drama Queen" / "Plain Jane" / "Jimmy Jaguar" / "Dead Doll")
 "I Wish It Could Be Christmas Everyday" (2012) Last Rockers – limited edition of 500, four track CD single
 "A Dog Is For Life" (2013) Last Rockers – limited edition of 500, four track CD single
 Christmas Hangover EP (2014) Shout Proud – Germany only, limited edition 7" single (3 formats)
 "Run, Run Rudolph" (2015) Last Rockers – limited edition of 500
 Sock It To Me Santa EP (2016) Last Rockers – limited edition of 500, five track CD single
 Hey Mr Christmas EP (2017) Last Rockers – limited edition of 200, four track CD single
 "Ignored To Death" (Dec 2018) Last Rockers – limited edition of 500, four track CD single, white sleeve
 "I Dare To Breathe" (Apr 2019) Last Rockers – limited edition of 500, five track CD single
 "Mainstream Media" (Jul 2019) Last Rockers – limited edition of 500, four track CD single
 "Born in a War" (Nov 2019) Last Rockers – limited edition of 500, four track CD single
 "Ignored To Death" (Nov 2019) Last Rockers – limited edition of 500, four track CD single, black sleeve
 "When You Were 17" (Mar 2020) Last Rockers – limited edition of 500, four track CD single
 Vice-o-lation Vol 1 EP (Jun 2020) Last Rockers – limited edition of 300, four track CD single, green sleeve
 Vice-o-lation Vol 2 EP (Aug 2020) Last Rockers – limited edition of 300, four track CD single, purple sleeve
 Vice-o-lation Vol 3 EP (Dec 2020) Last Rockers – limited edition of 300, four track CD single, red sleeve
 Vice of Spades EP (May 2021) Last Rockers – limited edition of 300, four track CD single, Motörhead covers EP
 Road Crew EP (Sep 2021) Last Rockers – limited edition of 300, four track CD single, Motörhead covers EP

Other appearances

Studio tracks

Reception 
AllMusic described the band as significant in the second wave of British punk rock, noting their promotion of animal rights and vegetarianism.

References

English punk rock groups
Musical groups from Bristol
Street punk groups
Musical groups established in 1978